Chittorgarh district is one of the 33 districts of Rajasthan state in western India. The historic city of Chittaurgarh is the administrative headquarters of the district. The district was established on 1 August 1948 by integrating portions of various princely states: Mewar, Pratabgarh, Tonk, and Jhalawar. Chittaurgarh is famous for the Chittor fort, home to various famous Rajput dynasties.

Economy
In 2006 the Ministry of Panchayati Raj named Chittorgarh one of the country's 250 most backward districts (out of a total of 640). It is one of the twelve districts in Rajasthan currently receiving funds from the Backward Regions Grant Fund Programme (BRGF).

Demographics

According to the 2011 census Chittorgarh district has a population of 1,544,338, roughly equal to the nation of Gabon or the US state of Hawaii. This gives it a ranking of 323rd in India (out of a total of 640).

Its population growth rate over the decade 2001-2011 was  16.09%. Chittaurgarh has a sex ratio of 970 females for every 1000 males, and a literacy rate of 62.51%. 18.47% of the population lives in urban areas. Scheduled Castes and Scheduled Tribes make up 16.20% and 13.05% of the population respectively.

At the time of the 2011 census, 67.88% of the population spoke Mewari, 15.52% Rajasthani and 13.86% Hindi as their first language.

See also
 Chittor Fort
 Sanwariaji Temple
 Kalika Mata Temple, Chittorgarh Fort
 Avari Mata temple
 Tourism in Rajasthan
 Bassi dam

References

External links

Official website of Chittorgarh district

 
Districts of Rajasthan
Districts in Udaipur division
States and territories established in 1948